CSIA may refer to:

Airports
 Chhatrapati Shivaji International Airport, Mumbai, India
 Chengdu Shuangliu International Airport, Chengdu, Sichuan, China

Schools
 Camborne Science and International Academy, Cornwall, England
 Cheongshim International Academy, Gyeonggi Province, South Korea
 Columbus Spanish Immersion Academy, Ohio, U.S.

Other
 Canadian Ski Instructors' Alliance
 Certified Securities Investment Advisor in South Korea
 China Software Industry Association
 Customer Service Institute of Australia

See also
Calgary Society of Independent Filmmakers (CSIF)
CISA (disambiguation)
CSAI (disambiguation)